Sinezona ferriezi is a species of minute sea snail, a marine gastropod mollusk or micromollusk in the family Scissurellidae, the little slit snails.

Description
The height of the yellowish-white shell reaches 1½ mm. The umbilicate shell has a turbinate-subdepressed shape. It is longitudinally and subobliquely striatulate. The short spire is obtuse; The spire consists of 3-3½ whorls. The first whorl is smooth, and separated by simple sutures. The remaining whorls are rather plane, lamellosely bicarinate above the middle, channelled between the carinae. The body whorl is subdescending, and is a little
constricted just below the carina, then  inflated and convex. The groove terminates a short distance behind the lip in an oblong foramen, which does not attain the edge of the lip, a smooth space intervening. The aperture is ovate-rounded. The simple peristome  is  thin, acute, and subcontinuous.

Distribution
This marine species occurs off New Caledonia.

References

 Geiger D.L. (2012) Monograph of the little slit shells. Volume 1. Introduction, Scissurellidae. pp. 1-728. Volume 2. Anatomidae, Larocheidae, Depressizonidae, Sutilizonidae, Temnocinclidae. pp. 729–1291. Santa Barbara Museum of Natural History Monographs Number 7.

External links
 To Biodiversity Heritage Library (1 publication)
 To Encyclopedia of Life
 To World Register of Marine Species

Scissurellidae
Gastropods described in 1867